Galleh Vari (also Romanized as Galleh Vārī; also known as Qal‘eh Vārī and Qalleh Vārī) is a village in Qaleh Tall Rural District, in the Central District of Bagh-e Malek County, Khuzestan Province, Iran. At the 2006 census, its population was 127, in 29 families.

References 

Populated places in Bagh-e Malek County